Solanum luteoalbum is a species of plant in the family Solanaceae.

Solanum semicoalitum as described by Bitter is an invalid name for this plant that is sometimes still seen. Altogether, the following synonyms are assigned to this species:
 Cyphomandra luteoalba (Pers.) A.Child
 Cyphomandra luteoalbum (Pers.) A.Child ex Bohs
 Solanum luteoalbum var. tunya J.F.Macbr.
 Solanum pubescens Ruiz & Pav. (non Willd.: preoccupied)
S. pubescens Roxb. is a nomen nudum. S. pubescens B.Heyne ex Walp. is S. violaceum Ortega.
 Solanum semicoalitum Bitter

The puzzling S. semicoalitum was classified as Critically Endangered endemic of Ecuador by the IUCN, before it was synonymized with the more widespread S. luteoalbum.

References

Footnotes
 
  (2004): Solanum luteoalbum. Version of May 2004. Retrieved 2008-SEP-30.

luteoalbum
Flora of Ecuador
Taxonomy articles created by Polbot
Taxobox binomials not recognized by IUCN